"Piove (Ciao, ciao bambina)" ("It's raining [Bye, bye baby]") is an Italian song written by Domenico Modugno and Eduardo Verde. It won first prize at the 1959 Sanremo Music Festival, where it was performed twice, once by Modugno and once by Johnny Dorelli.

Dalida recorded a song in French as "Ciao ciao bambina", which became a big hit in France and Canada and a pop standard in the francophone world. It was used in Ralph Lauren commercial for their fall 2021 collection.

Background
The song is a dramatic ballad, with Modugno telling his lover that he knows their relationship is about to come to a close. He asks her for one more kiss and then tells her not to turn back as she walks away from him, because he still has feelings for her.

Eurovision
The song was chosen as the Italian entry in the Eurovision Song Contest 1959 and Modugno was chosen to perform it. The song was performed third on the night, following 's Birthe Wilke with "Uh, jeg ville ønske jeg var dig" and preceding 's Jacques Pills with "Mon ami Pierrot". At the close of voting, it had received 9 points, placing 6th in a field of 11.

It was succeeded as Italian representative at the 1960 contest by Renato Rascel with "Romantica".

Charts
Moudugno's version

Dalida's version

Other recordings
Dalida covered it in Italian and was the first one to record a French version. The Italian version remained unreleased until a posthoumus album Italia mia in 1991. The French version was first issued on EP in 1959 and was the leading track of her album Le disque d'or de Dalida the same year.
In 1959 the song entered the Hong Kong Hit Parade after being recorded by a local group – The Yee Tin Tong Mandolin Band – and released by Diamond Records (B-side: "Oh Marie").
Also in 1959, French bandleader Jacky Noguez, along with his Musuette Orchestra, recorded an instrumental version which peaked at #24 on the US Hot 100.
In 1961, this song was covered by Hong Kong female singer Kong Ling on her LP album Off-Beat Cha Cha with the local Diamond Records.
Italo-American tenor Sergio Franchi recorded this song on his 1966 RCA Victor album La Dolce Italy.
In 2015, Italian operatic pop trio Il Volo recorded a rendition of this song on their EP Sanremo Grande Amore.

References

Songs about weather
Songs about parting
1959 songs
Domenico Modugno songs
Eurovision songs of 1959
Eurovision songs of Italy
Number-one singles in Italy
Sanremo Music Festival songs
Ultratop 50 Singles (Flanders) number-one singles
Songs written by Domenico Modugno
1950s ballads
Songs with lyrics by Dino Verde